Judith D. Sally (born Judith Donovan on March 23, 1937 in Manhattan, New York) is a Professor Emeritus of Mathematics at Northwestern University. Her research is in commutative algebra, particularly in the study of Noetherian local rings and graded rings.

Life and education
Judith Donovan was born to Dr. and Mrs. Edward J. Donovan in Manhattan, New York in 1937.  She finished high school at the Convent of Sacred Heart in New York and pursued her undergraduate studies at Barnard College, earning her bachelor's degree  in 1958.  After graduating from Barnard, she began graduate studies in mathematics at Brandeis University in Waltham, Massachusetts.  At Brandeis, she met Paul J. Sally, Jr, who was in the doctoral program in mathematics at Brandeis.  Judith and Paul were married in November 1959, while Paul was still in graduate school. In 1960, Judith Sally was awarded a master's degree in mathematics from Brandeis. Judith and Paul had three sons, David, Stephen, and Paul III, while Paul was completing his dissertation and consequently, Judith postponed her doctoral studies. Paul completed his Ph.D. at Brandeis in 1965 and joined the faculty at the University of Chicago that same year.

In 1968, Judith entered the doctoral program in mathematics at Chicago.
In 1971, Judith Sally was awarded her Ph.D. in mathematics from University of Chicago. Her thesis "Regular Overrings of Regular Local Rings" was supervised by Irving Kaplansky.

Career
After completion of her doctoral studies, Sally spent 1971–1972 in a postdoctoral position at Rutgers University in New Brunswick, New Jersey. Sally joined the faculty at Northwestern University in 1972. In 1977, she received a Sloan Fellowship. She received a Bunting Fellowship at the Mary Ingraham Institute at Radcliffe College for the 1981-1982 academic year. Sally was awarded a National Science Foundation Visiting Professorship for Women for the 1988–1989 academic year, during which time she visited Purdue University in West Lafayette, Indiana. At Northwestern she won the College of Arts and Sciences Teaching Award.   In 1995, she was invited to give the Association for Women in Mathematics Noether Lecture, an honor "for fundamental and sustained contributions to the mathematical sciences". She wrote a research monograph Number of generators of ideals in rings that was published by Marcel Dekker in 1978. She has published several books on mathematics education with her husband, Paul Sally.

Selected publications

References

External links
 Judith D. Sally's Author Profile on MathSciNet
 Judith D. Sally's Profile on zbMATH

1937 births
Living people
University of Chicago alumni
Barnard College alumni
American women mathematicians
Northwestern University faculty
20th-century American mathematicians
21st-century American mathematicians
Place of birth missing (living people)
20th-century women mathematicians
21st-century women mathematicians
20th-century American women
21st-century American women